Adrienne Corri (born Adrienne Riccoboni; 13 November 1931 – 13 March 2016) was a Scottish actress.

Early life 
She was born Adrienne Riccoboni in Glasgow in November 1931, the daughter of an English mother (Olive Smethurst) and an Italian father (Luigi Riccoboni; sometimes spelt Reccobini). In the 1930s, her father Luigi (known as Louis) ran the Crown Hotel in Callander, Stirling. She had one brother.

Career 
Corri may be best known for one of her smaller parts, that of Mary Alexander, wife of the writer Frank Alexander (played by Patrick Magee), in Stanley Kubrick's dystopian A Clockwork Orange (1971). Corri, not originally cast in the film, was offered the role after two actresses had already withdrawn from the production, one of them, according to Malcolm McDowell (who played Alex DeLarge), because she found it "too humiliating – because it involved having to be perched, naked, on Warren Clarke's (playing "Dim the Droog") shoulders for weeks on end while Stanley decided which shot he liked the best." Corri had no such qualms about appearing naked, joking to McDowell: "Well, Malcolm, you're about to find out that I'm a real redhead." 

Corri earned Kubrick's respect by her willingness to undergo the gruelling process of shooting endless takes. She recalled: "For four days I was bashed about by Malcolm (Alex) and he really hit me. One scene was shot 39 times until Malcolm said 'I can't hit her any more!'"

Corri's film debut was in The Romantic Age (1949), which was followed by Jean Renoir's version of The River (1951). Her other film roles included Lara's mother in David Lean's Dr. Zhivago and Dorothy in Otto Preminger's thriller Bunny Lake Is Missing (both 1965). She also appeared in a number of horror and suspense films until the 1970s including Devil Girl from Mars (1954), The Tell-Tale Heart (1960), A Study in Terror (1965) and Vampire Circus (1972). She also appeared as Therese Duval in Revenge of the Pink Panther (1978).

She appeared in such diverse productions as the science fiction movie Moon Zero Two (1969) and a television version of Twelfth Night (1970), directed by John Sichel, as the Countess Olivia, where she played opposite Sir Alec Guinness as Malvolio.

Her other television credits include Angelica in Sword of Freedom (1958), Yolanda in The Invisible Man episode "Crisis in the Desert" (1958), regular roles in A Family at War and You're Only Young Twice (both 1971 – the latter a television series created by Jack Trevor Story), Mena in the Doctor Who story "The Leisure Hive" (1980), and Veronica in Love in a Cold Climate (1980). She guest-starred as the mariticidal Liz Newton in the UFO episode "The Square Triangle" (1970) and was in two episodes of Danger Man (US: Secret Agent, both 1965). She was equally at home in the classics of British theatre, giving an outstanding performance as Lady Fidget in a BBC Play of the Month, William Wycherley's Restoration comedy The Country Wife (1977), with Helen Mirren.

Corri had a major stage career, appearing regularly both in London and in the provincial theatres. She appeared in one of the first English performances in 1968 of Come and Go, Samuel Beckett's one-act "dramaticule", in Beckett's coinage, performed at the Royal Festival Hall as part of "a gala entertainment concerning depravity and corruption" (the words coming from the nineteenth-century definition of obscenity), sponsored by the National Council for Civil Liberties and the Defence of Literature and the Arts Society, which raised funds to support publishers being prosecuted for obscenity. It was directed by Deryk Mendel, with Corri appearing alongside Marie Kean and Billie Whitelaw in the roles of Flo, Vi, and Ru. The evening included both classical and rock music, and a mixed programme compèred by George Melly. In his entry for Clifford Anthony Smythe in the online Oxford Dictionary of National Biography, John Calder records that "The profit was much less than expected for a sold-out house, as the person who had volunteered to organise the souvenir programme spent too little time finding advertisers as against providing editorial content."

Personal life 
Corri was known for her feisty personality. When the audience booed on the first night of John Osborne's The World of Paul Slickey, she responded by raising two fingers to the audience and shouting: "Go fuck yourselves". During the making of Moon Zero Two, she poured a glass of iced water inside James Olson's rubber space suit. Despite his uncomfortable state, Olson was obliged to wear the suit for the remainder of the day's shooting.

Corri was acquainted with many of the leading figures in the British theatre, including Joe Orton, who recounted in his diaries that he asked her advice on how best to end his relationship with his lover, Kenneth Halliwell. She enjoyed a good relationship with Stanley Kubrick, who joked with her that, in the home invasion sequence in A Clockwork Orange, she was cast in "the Debbie Reynolds part", a reference to Reynolds's role in the film Singin' in the Rain (1952). After completing A Clockwork Orange, Corri kept in touch with Kubrick, who complained to her about the problem he had of losing socks whenever he did the washing, so for Christmas she gave him a pair of bright red socks, a humorous reference to her scene in A Clockwork Orange in which, after Alex had finished snipping off her red pyjama suit, she was naked except for a pair of red socks.

In the louche atmosphere of the 1960s, when peers, film stars and gangsters rubbed shoulders, Corri became acquainted with some of London's demi-monde, including the much-married bon viveur John Wodehouse, 4th Earl of Kimberley, as well as socialising with other actors, and the Kray twins at their El Morocco club, one of the haunts of Conservative politician Robert Boothby, an acquaintance of the Krays, who used the twin brothers to supply him with rent boys.

She had two children, Patrick and Sarah Filmer-Sankey, from a relationship with the film producer Patrick Filmer-Sankey in the 1950s.

Corri died at her home in London on 13 March 2016 from coronary artery disease, at the age of 84.

Gainsborough studies 
She was the author of The Search for Gainsborough, a book written in diary form, detailing her efforts to establish the provenance of a painting of David Garrick which she believed to be by a young Thomas Gainsborough. She also wrote a scholarly article in The Burlington Magazine about the portrait and its connection to Gainsborough's very early work Self Portrait as a Boy,  1739 (the latter can be seen online at the Historical Portraits Image Library).

Corri's research and her article are discussed in "Tom will be a genius – new landscapes by the young Thomas Gainsborough", the catalogue of an exhibition at Philip Mould Ltd, 4–28 July 2009, with text by Lindsay Stainton and Bendor Grosvenor. Corri's claim that the painting was by the young Gainsborough was based on her detailed research into the archives of the Bank of England, which indicated that significant financial payments were made to Gainsborough while he was still a boy. Following a claim by Corri for the expense incurred restoring and authenticating the picture, the painting was given to her in May 1990, in an out-of-court settlement with the Alexandra Theatre in Birmingham, which disputed her valuation and the attribution to Gainsborough.

Marriage 
Corri was married to actor Daniel Massey from 1961 until they divorced in 1967. The marriage to Massey proved to be somewhat tempestuous, with Massey describing the relationship in the following terms, "We were agonizingly incompatible but we had an extraordinary physical attraction." Massey envisaged a domestic life for Corri but she realised that she was not suited to being a full-time housewife, and after a six-year hiatus she resumed her career as an actress.

Filmography

References

External links 

Adrienne Corri  at HorrorStars

1931 births
2016 deaths
20th-century British actresses
Actresses from Glasgow
British film actresses
British stage actresses
British television actresses
Adrienne Corri
Scottish people of English descent
Scottish people of Italian descent
20th-century British businesspeople
Deaths from coronary artery disease